Samuel Crockett (May 10, 1821September 19, 1900) was an English American immigrant, businessman, Democratic politician, and Wisconsin pioneer.  He served in the Wisconsin State Assembly, representing Marquette County during the 1877 session.

Biography
Samuel Crockett was born in Manchester, England, in May 1821.  As a child, he was present at the opening of the Liverpool and Manchester Railway, the first steam-powered railroad in the world.  He received a common school education until age 13, when he went to work as an auxiliary at the Manchester Royal Infirmary.  Three years later, he secured an apprenticeship as a tailor, which he followed to completion.

He emigrated to the United States in 1843, settling first in Utica, New York, then later in New York City, and Stewartsville, New Jersey, where he was married.  During these years, he worked as a journeyman tailor at various locations in the states of New York, Pennsylvania, and New Jersey.

Crockett determined to move to the west in 1856 to seek better opportunities.  He arrived in Wisconsin in May 1856, and settled at Westfield, in Marquette County, where he resumed his work as a merchant tailor.  He switched to a general merchandise trade in 1859, opening the first general store in Westfield.  He was very successful in his business career and was one of the wealthiest and best-known residents of Marquette County in the late 19th century.

Crockett was a staunch Democrat throughout his political career.  He served eight terms as coroner of Marquette County, serving from 1856 to 1874, and was justice of the peace for 25 years.  He was elected to the Wisconsin State Assembly in the Fall of 1876 and served in the 1877 session.  At the time, his district comprised all of Marquette County.

Crockett died at his home in Westfield in September 1900.

Personal life and family
Samuel Crockett was one of thirteen children born to Thomas and Sarah ( Goodall) Crockett.  Samuel was the only member of his family to emigrate from England.

Samuel Crockett married Eliza Snyder, the daughter of Frederick Snyder.  Frederick Snyder was one of the first settlers at Stewartsville, New Jersey, and a descendant of early Dutch colonists in America.  Samuel and Eliza had four children together, though all but one died in childhood.  Their only surviving child was George Byron Crockett.

Electoral history

Wisconsin Assembly (1877)

| colspan="6" style="text-align:center;background-color: #e9e9e9;"| General Election, November 7, 1876

References

External links
 

1821 births
1900 deaths
Politicians from Manchester
English emigrants to the United States
People from Warren County, New Jersey
People from Westfield, Marquette County, Wisconsin
American tailors
Businesspeople from Wisconsin
19th-century American politicians
Democratic Party members of the Wisconsin State Assembly